Deposed Queen Yun of the Haman Yun clan (15 July 1455 – 29 August 1482) was the second wife of Yi Hyeol, King Seongjong and the mother of Yi Yung, Prince Yeonsan. She was Queen of Joseon from 1476 until her deposition in 1479. She was an 11th generation descendant of General Yun Gwan (윤관).

Originally a concubine of the King, she was elevated to queen rank after Han Song-yi's death. The ousting of the Queen in 1479, and her subsequent death by poison in 1482 became a source of recurrent political turmoil, culminating with the First literati purge organized in 1498 by Yeonsan in the 4th year of his reign.

Biography

Early life 
Lady Yun was born on 15 July 1455 during King Danjong’s reign as the only daughter to Yun Gi-Gyeon of the Haman Yun clan and his second wife, Lady Shin of the Goryeong Shin clan. She had three older half-brothers and an older brother.

Through her brother, her grandniece married Yi Ryang; the maternal uncle of Queen Insun, the wife of King Myeongjong. Through her mother, Lady Yun is a first cousin once removed of Shin Suk-ju.

Palace life 
In a first time, she was a concubine of Seongjong, granted the title Suk-ui (숙의, 淑儀), junior 2nd rank concubine of the King. In 1473, Han Song-yi who was Seongjong's first queen consort died and posthumously honoured as Queen Gonghye.

Because she died without issue, the King was urged by counselors to take a second queen consort to secure the royal succession. Royal Consort Suk-ui was chosen as new queen consort for her beauty, and was instated in 8 August 1476 at the age of 21. Several months later, she gave birth to Yi Yung, later to become King Yeonsan.

The new queen proved to be temperamental and highly jealous of Seongjong's remaining concubines, even stooping to poisoning one of them in 1477. One night in 1479, she clawed the King, leaving visible scratch marks on his face. The King tried to conceal the injury, but his mother, Queen Dowager Insu, discovered the truth and ordered the Queen to be deposed and sent into exile.

After several rehabilitation attempts initiated by her party, influential government officials petitioned for her execution. Deposed Queen was sentenced to death by poisoning. She gave the cloth with her blood on it to her mother and asked for it to be given to her son.

She later became known as Deposed Queen Yun. The meaning of "Pyebi Yun-ssi" (폐비윤씨, 廢妃 尹氏), her current name in Korea, is "deposed consort of the Haman Yun family". Western references are rather using Deposed Lady Yun as in.

Aftermath 
After her death, court officials urged to pick a wife from within King Seongjong’s concubines. One court official’s daughter, Royal Consort Suk-ui of the Paepyeong Yun clan, became Queen Consort.

It is argued that Queen Jeonghyeon helped to bring Queen Yun’s demise along with her father Yun Ho and her 6th cousin, Yun Pil-sang. But it is unknown how much Queen Jeonghyeon, who was 17 years old at the time, was involved in the abolition of the now deposed Queen Yun. It’s speculated that Queen Jeongsun was also behind it.

Her son, Prince Yeonsan, grew up thinking Queen Jeonghyeon was his birth mother. But in 1494, the young king eventually learned of what had happened to his biological mother and attempted to posthumously restore her titles and position. Because of officials standing in his way, the manner and matter of her death became a pretext for her son to purge the court and government of opponents and critics of his rule.

During Yeonsan's reign, he honored his mother with the posthumous title "Queen Jeheon" (제헌왕후, 齊獻王后).

Family
Parent

 Father − Yun Gi-gyeon (윤기견)
 a) Grandfather − Yun Eung (윤응)
 b) Great-Grandfather − Yun Deuk-ryong (윤득룡, 尹得龍)
 c) Great-Great-Grandfather - Yun Hui (윤희, 尹禧)
 b) Great-Grandmother − Lady Min of the Yeoheung Min clan (정부인 여흥 민씨, 貞夫人 驪興 閔氏)
 a) Grandmother − Lady Kwon of the Andong Kwon clan (안동 권씨); daughter of Kwon So (권소)
 Aunt − Lady Yun of the Haman Yun clan. Husband: Choi Cheom-ro (최첨로, 崔添老)
 Cousin − Choi Mun-sun (최문손, 崔文孫)
 Cousin − Choi Hyo-sun (최효손, 崔孝孫)
 Mother − Lady Shin of the Goryeong Shin clan (증 부부인 고령 신씨 (贈 府夫人 高靈 申氏) (? - 1504); Yun Gi-gyeon's second wife
 a) Grandfather − Shin Pyeong (신평, 申枰) (1390–1455)
 a) Grandmother − Lady Ma of the Jangheung Ma clan (정부인 장흥 마씨, 貞夫人 長興 馬氏); Shin Pang's second wife
 Stepmother − Lady Yi of the Yangseong Yi clan (증 부부인 양성 이씨, 贈 府夫人 陽城 李氏)

Sibling

 Older half-brother − Yun Woo (윤우, 尹遇)
 Half-niece − Lady Yun of the Haman Yun clan (윤씨, 尹氏). Husband: Jeong Jin (정진, 鄭秦)
 Older half-brother − Yun Hae (윤해, 尹邂)
 Older half-brother − Yun Hu (윤후, 尹逅)
 Older brother − Yun Gu (윤구, 尹遘) (? – 1513). Wife: Lady Kwon of the Andong Kwon clan (정부인 안동 권씨, 貞夫人 安東 權氏)
 Nephew − Yun Ji-im (윤지임, 尹之任)
 Grandnephew − Yun Woon (윤운, 尹雲)
 Grandnephew − Yun Je (윤제, 尹霽); became the adoptive son of Yun Ji-hwa
 Nephew − Yun Ji-hwa (윤지화, 尹之和) (1476–1558)
 Nephew − Yun Ji-cheong (윤지청, 尹之淸)
 Grandnephew − Yun Rim (윤림, 尹霖)
 Grandniece − Lady Yun of the Haman Yun clan. Husband: Grandnephew-in-law: Yi Ryang (이량, 李樑) (17 November 1519 – 8 March 1563)

Husband
 King Seongjong of Joseon (20 August 1457 – 20 January 1494) (조선 성종)

Issue
 Son − Yi Yung, King Yeonsan (23 November 1476 – 20 November 1506) (조선 연산군). Wife: Queen Jeinwondeok of the Geochang Shin clan (제인원덕 신씨) (15 December 1476 – 16 May 1537)
 Son - unnamed grand prince (대군) (? – 1479)

In popular culture

Media depictions
 Portrayed by Lee Gi-sun in the 1984–1985 MBC TV series 500 Years of Joseon – The Ume Tree in the Midst of the Snow.
Portrayed by Sunwoo Eun-sook in the 1987 film Prince Yeonsan.
Portrayed by Kim Yeong-ae in the 1988 film Diary of King Yeonsan.
Portrayed by Jang Seo-hee in the 1994 KBS TV series Han Myeong-hoe.
Portrayed by Kim Sung-ryung in the 1998–2000 KBS TV series The King and the Queen.
Portrayed by Lee Joo-hee in the 2003–2004 MBC TV series Dae Jang Geum.
Portrayed by Ku Hye-sun and Park Bo-young in the 2007–2008 SBS TV series The King and I.
 Portrayed by Jeon Hye-bin and Jin Ji-hee in the 2011–2012 JTBC TV series Insu, The Queen Mother.
 Portrayed by Kim Ji-young in the 2015 film The Treacherous.
 Portrayed by Woo Hee-jin in the 2017 KBS2 TV series Queen for Seven Days.

Novels 
 Blood on the Royal Sleeve by Park Chong-hwa.

See also

History of Korea
Joseon Dynasty politics

References

External links 
 Deposed Queen Lady Yun's Death Events
 Deposed Queen Lady Yun-Omaynews
 Deposed Queen Lady Yun

1455 births
1482 deaths

Executed Korean women
Executed royalty
15th-century executions
People executed by poison
Royal consorts of the Joseon dynasty
Korean queens consort
People from Gyeonggi Province